Spare Change is an American comedy independent film directed by Jonathan Talbert and Arturo Guzman. The film made its premiere at the Hollywood Reel Independent Film Festival on February 14, 2015 where Elyse Levesque took home the award for Best Supporting Actress. The film was released worldwide on VOD and Digital Download on August 4, 2015.

Plot 
After getting fired from her job by her boss Sheila, millennial Jane is unable to find stable work. So along with her best friend Lily, they hatch a plan to feign homelessness to make a quick buck; finding different, creative ways to get money from strangers. Although successful at first, when Jane befriends an actual homeless girl, Elizabeth, along with her ex-boyfriend Aaron showing up back in town to work with non-profit homeless shelters, Jane's life quickly begins to unravel.

Cast 
 Lissa Lauria
 Elyse Levesque
 Curt Mega
 Jordy Lucas
 Neil Grayston
 Krista Allen
 Jim O'Heir
 Madylin Sweeten
 Anthony Fanelli
 Nathan Barnatt
 Ross Marquand
 Alison Becker
 Jordon Black
 Jackie Long
 Lyndsey Doolen
 Robin Steffen
 Brittany Belland
 Grant Cotter

References

External links
 

2015 films
American comedy films
2015 comedy films
2010s English-language films
2010s American films